Te Kuha is a small village located to the east of Westport in the Buller District of the West Coast region of New Zealand's South Island.  It is located at the western end of the Lower Buller Gorge, with the Buller River flowing through the village.

It was the site of a punt that connected Westport to the south bank before the "black bridge" was constructed at Westport itself.  runs on the southern bank of the river, and the Stillwater - Westport Line railway runs on the northern bank.  This railway was opened to Te Kuha from Westport in 1912, but a connection through the Buller Gorge to connect with the railway in Inangahua Junction was not completed until 1942.  Passenger services no longer pass through Te Kuha and the railway mainly transports coal to the east coast port of Lyttelton.

There is not much evidence that the village at Te Kuha even existed now in 2006. The road ends as the railway enters the Buller Gorge, and the surrounding flats are used for farming. There are no building remains, and further access on the railway side of the Buller river is discouraged by the railway activity. Although this point was the punt crossing in the early days for the road on the south bank at Windy Point, the building of the black bridge across the Buller spelt the death knell of Te Kuha. However, the railway was opened as far as Cascade Creek where coal bins stored the coal flumed down from the Cascade Mine for loading into trains for shipment at Westport. During World War II the Government completed the Buller Gorge Railway in 1942 and finally connected the isolated "Westport section" to the rest of the South Island Railway system.

Te Kuha was classified as a "limited employment locality" in 2004, with the government cancelling benefits for unemployed individuals who moved to the area.

External links
 Limited Employment Localities list that includes Te Kuha

Buller District
Populated places in the West Coast, New Zealand